Scovill Zoo in Decatur, Illinois, is one of 210 zoos accredited by the Association of Zoos and Aquariums with 96 species spanning six continents and around 500 animals in residence. The zoo originally started out as a farm in 1967 when the Kiwanis Club donated money for its construction. Scovill Zoo has its own chapter of the AAZK or American Association of Zoo Keepers. The zoo participates in a large number of conservation projects and education.

History
In 1947, Guy Norman and Rose Scovill donated the property for Scovill Gardens (which now include the Scovill Zoo) to the Decatur Park District.

The zoo first opened to the public in Decatur, Illinois in 1967 under the name of Scovill Farm. The Kiwanis Club had donated $14,000 to begin building the farm; initially it housed pigs, chickens, goats, and other farm animals. Additional donations were obtained to cover construction costs, which totaled $56,000.

Scovill Zoo, as it is now called, houses hundreds of animals from nearly one hundred species including cheetahs, gray wolves, zebras, and alligators, along with the original farm animals. On September 25, 2006, Scovill Zoo became one of 210 zoos recognized by the Association of Zoos and Aquariums. In the spring of 2007, Scovill Zoo created a local chapter of the AAZK or American Association of Zoo Keepers to further education.

Scovill Zoo director, Mike Borders, retired in 2008 after serving at Scovill for many years. The current director, Dave Webster has been at the Scovill Zoo for 20 years. Assistant Director Ken Frye came on board in 2009.

Conservation projects 

Scovill Zoo places great emphasis on conservation through education and donation of funds to support organizations working to conserve both animal populations as well as the environment.

AAZK chapter 

The American Association of Zoo Keepers was formed in 1967 in San Diego, California. It serves as an educational opportunity for zookeepers to learn from one another and continue education. Scovill Zoo formed its own chapter in 2007. The chapter aids in conservation projects such as Bowling for Rhinos, golden lion tamarin of Brazil conservation, De Wildt Cheetah and Wildlife Trust, and the Snow Leopard Trust.

Cheetah conservation 

Scovill Zoo's two African cheetahs, Jafari and Runako, were born in Africa before coming to live at Scovill Zoo. Due to threats to their habitat as well as other factors, cheetahs have been placed on the list of threatened species. Scovill Zoo is doing its part to help cheetahs survive by donating five cents of each paid zoo admission. The money collected goes to the De Wildt Cheetah and Wildlife Conservation Centre.
The money raised by admissions goes to the organization's census study of free-roaming cheetahs in South Africa. The organization uses radio collars and survey farmers to try to gain a better grasp on the number of cheetahs still roaming Africa. With more information, the organization hopes to be able to learn more about where the cheetahs are and help cheetahs and humans coexist more peacefully.

Save a Rainforest 

By donating to the Conservation Parking Meter, set up by the Center for Ecosystem Survival, at Scovill Zoo, guests are able to give money to the Rincon Rainforest, which is  along the north edge of the eastern part of the Area de Conservacion Guanacaste, in Costa Rica.

Children's education 

"Scovill Zoo’s education programs offer opportunities designed to help animal lovers of all ages explore and discover the animal kingdom through unique and innovative experiences. From our Zoo Academy to our Mobile Zoo, our education programs provide fun, hands-on connections to the animal world", states the Scovill Zoo website.

Classes and programs are as follows:

Features 
The Z.O. & O. Express Train The  Z.O. & O. Express Train travels a  path through the zoo. The passengers receive a guided tour and behind-the-scenes look at some of the animals residing at Scovill Zoo. Originally added in 1984, the train is a modeled after an 1863 C. P. Huntington steam train.

The Endangered Species Carousel The Endangered Species Carousel consists of 30 hand-carved wooden animals, each representing species protected and endangered. The carousel was designed especially for Scovill Zoo and has proved to be one of the zoo's most popular attractions.

Exhibits

Seasonal adjustments 

Because of Illinois' changing climate, Scovill Zoo must make special accommodations for some of the animals in residence.

Summer 

Scovill Zoo responds to high rises in temperature during the summer months by using fans, pools, and a variety of frozen treats for their animals. Though each animal is supplied with shade in their habitat, animals with thick fur coats like the wolves can still overheat. Zookeepers often prepare "frozen blood balls" for the wolves out of the drippings of their meat diet. Other animals, such as the pelicans, are misted by keepers or provided with fans and pools.

Winter 

The zoo, which closes to the public during the winter months, has made several adjustments to existing habitats and has added new buildings to house animals that are not equipped for the drop in temperature. Acclimated animals such as wolves and cheetahs are allowed to remain in their exhibits all year long; animals from non-acclimated species, such as tropical birds, alligators, and primates, are moved to heated buildings.

Scovill Zoo is typically open from the start of April until the end of October.

Following is a list of animals that can be found at Scovill Zoo:

Birds 

Chicken
Crane, East African crowned
Conure, sun
Dove, ringed turtle
Duck, call
Duck, crested
Eagle, bald
Egret, cattle
Emu
Flamingo, Chilean
Fowl, guinea
Gull, ring-billed
Hawk, red-tailed
Kookaburra, laughing

Macaw, blue-and-yellow
Macaw, red-and-green
Owl, barn
Owl, great horned
Owl, screech
Peafowl
Pelican, American white
Pheasant, golden
Pigeon
Teal, ringed
Toucan, red billed
Vulture, turkey
Turaco, Lady Ross’
Penguin, Humboldt

Fish 

Goldfish

Insects and spiders 
Cockroach, Madagascar hissing
Scorpion, emperor
Scorpion, plains stripeless
Tarantula

Mammals 

Bat, Egyptian fruit
Binturong
Camel, Bactrian
Capybara
Cheetah
Chinchilla
Coati, white-nosed
Cow
Deer, tufted
Deer, white-tailed
Degu, common
Ferret
Goat, African pygmy
Goat, Nubian
Guinea hog
Guinea pig
Hedgehog, African pygmy

Lemur, ring-tailed
Llama
Meerkat
Monkey, spider
Panda, red
Prairie dog, black-tailed
Rabbit
Tamarin, cotton-top
Tamarin, Geoffroy's
Tamarin, golden lion
Tenrec, lesser hedgehog
Wallaby, red-necked
Wolf, gray
Zebra, Grant's
Zebu, dwarf

Reptiles and amphibians 

Alligator, American
Axolotl
Central bearded dragon
Boa constrictor
Desert rosy boa
Boa, smooth sand
Frog, African clawed
Argentine horned frog (PacMan frog)
Frog, poison arrow
Gecko, leopard
Iguana, green
Iguana, rhinoceros
Lizard, glass
Milksnake, Pueblan
Toad, giant marine
Tortoise, Galapagos
Tortoise, leopard

Tortoise, red-footed
Turtle, box
Turtle, map
Turtle, painted
Turtle, red-eared slider
Monitor, Argus
Monitor, green tree
Monitor, savannah
Python, Burmese
Python, green tree
Skink, blue-tongued
Snake, corn
Snake, black rat
Snake, yellow rat
Tegu, black and yellow

Notes

External links

Zoos in Illinois
Zoos established in 1967
Decatur, Illinois
Buildings and structures in Macon County, Illinois
Tourist attractions in Macon County, Illinois
1967 establishments in Illinois